Pinniwallago kanpurensis is the only species in the genus Pinniwallago of the catfish (order Siluriformes) family Siluridae. This species is known only from Uttar Pradesh, India. It reaches a length of about 50 centimetres (20 in).

References

Siluridae
Fish of India
Endemic fauna of India
Fish described in 1981